The Academy is an English dual-control car built by West of Coventry between 1906 and 1908.  The cars had a 14 hp 4-cylinder engine by White and Poppe.

It was mainly sold to The Motor Academy in London, an early driving school who were probably the first to offer dual control (having additional set of driving controls) but was also available to the general public. The company showed at the 1906 Olympia Show which was formerly a horse show.

See also
 List of car manufacturers of the United Kingdom

Defunct motor vehicle manufacturers of England
Coventry motor companies